Fairport Harding High School is a public high school in Fairport Harbor, Ohio, Lake County, Ohio.  It is the only high school in the Fairport Harbor Exempted Village School District. Their mascot is the Skippers and compete as a member of the Ohio High School Athletic Association and is a member of the Northeastern Athletic Conference.

Athletics 
Fairport Harding High School currently offers:

 Baseball
 Basketball
 Bowling
 Cheerleading
 Cross Country
 Football
 Golf
 Softball
 Track and Field
 Volleyball

Ohio High School Athletic Association State Championships

 Boys Track and Field – 1964, 1965 
 Girls Bowling - 2018

Notes and references

External links
 District Website

High schools in Lake County, Ohio
Public high schools in Ohio